The Moth and the Flame may refer to:

The Moth & The Flame, American alternative rock band
Invocations/The Moth and the Flame, 1981 album by Keith Jarrett
Moth and the Flame, 1938 Silly Symphony animated short film
The Moth and the Flame (1915 film), a 1915 American silent drama film